St. Elijah's Church, church dedicated to the prophet Elijah, may refer to the following churches:

Albania
St. Elijah's Church, Buhal
St. Elijah's Monastery Church, Jorgucat
St. Elijah's Church, Moscopole
St. Elijah's Church, Stegopull

Bulgaria
Church of St Elijah, Boboshevo

Canada
Profitis Ilias Greek Orthodox Church, in Endeavour, Saskatchewan
St. Ilija Macedonian Orthodox Church, Mississauga
St. Elias Antiochian Orthodox Cathedral, in Ottawa

India
St Elijah Orthodox Syrian Church, Koduvila, Kerala
St Elias Orthodox church, Budhanoor, Kerala

Iraq
Dair Mar Elia, a monastery near Mosul

Kosovo
St. Elijah's Church, Podujevo

Romania
Church of St. Elijah, Timișoara

Russia
Church of Elijah the Prophet (Belozersk)

Syria
Saint Elias Cathedral, in Aleppo

United States
St. Elias Antiochian Orthodox Church (La Crosse, Wisconsin)